Městec Králové is a town in Nymburk District in the Central Bohemian Region of the Czech Republic. It has about 2,800 inhabitants.

Administrative parts
Villages of Nový and Vinice are administrative parts of Městec Králové.

Etymology
The name means "small town of the King". The original name of the town was Královo Městce, later it changed to Králův Městec and then to the current form.

Geography
It lies in the Central Elbe Table. The Štítarský Stream flows through the municipal territory.

History
Městec Králové was established as a walled town on the road from Hradec Králové to Prague in the 13th century.

According to legends, Queen Kunigunde, the wife of King Wenceslaus I of Bohemia, was returning from Červený Hradec (today Hradec Králové) to Prague and abruptly gave birth to Ottokar II of Bohemia, the most powerful king of the Přemyslid Dynasty, in Městec Králové. Ottokar II rewarded his assumed birthplace by a lion on its coats of arms and some privileges reserved for royal towns.

The town was almost destroyed during the Thirty Years' War and by large fires in 1680, 1746, 1776 and 1792.

Demographics

Transport
Městec Králové lies on a railway line of local importance Městec Králové–Chlumec nad Cidlinou.

Sights
The Church of Saint Margaret was built in 1793, after a fire in 1792 burned down the old building. In the 19th century, the church was repaired and a Romanesque tower was added.

In 1799, the town hall was built.

Notable people
Ottokar II of Bohemia (1233–1278), King of Bohemia
František Xaver Pokorný (1729–1794), composer and violinist
Otakar Zich (1879–1934), composer and aesthetician
Karel Schulz (1899–1943), writer
Ivan Hašek (born 1963), football player and manager
Aleš Hruška (born 1985), footballer
Bořek Dočkal (born 1988), footballer

References

External links

 

Cities and towns in the Czech Republic
Populated places established in the 13th century